Great Southern Hotels was a chain of hotels owned by Irish semi-state airport operator Aer Rianta; and eventually broken up in 2006. The chain was bought by Aer Rianta from fellow semi-state company CIÉ for IE£10m in 1990.

CIÉ, as operators of the state's railways, had inherited the railway hotel chains of predecessor companies - primarily the Great Southern & Western Railway, who had used the name Great Southern Hotel for their properties since the 19th Century, with the formalised Great Southern Hotels subsidiary being formed in 1963. CIÉ had developed further properties closer to roadways as private car transport increased; but closed other properties in the 1970s. Aer Rianta constructed hotels at its Dublin and Cork Airports, but did not extend the chain any further. It ran in to significant financial trouble in the latter era of CIÉ ownership, requiring a state bailout; and again before its dissolution by Aer Rianta

At the time of its break-up, the firm owned 8 hotels - 3 at Aer Rianta owned airports and 5 in other locations. They also operated and part-owned the City Hotel in Derry

Former Hotels

Open at time of closure
Cork Airport - Built in 1999. Sold to CG Hotels and originally operated as a Park Inn franchise. Now the Cork Airport Hotel
Derry - City Hotel, operated but only 25% owned 
Dublin Airport - Built in 1998. Sold to CG Hotels and now operated as a Radisson Blu.
Galway Eyre Square - Built 1855. Now the Hardiman Hotel.
Galway Corrib Great Southern - Built 1970. Sold but ceased to operate in 2007 Demolished in 2021 
Killarney - Built 1853. Now trading as the Great Southern Hotel again after being renamed to The Malton 
Rosslare, Wexford - Built 1969, did not sell at time of original breakup and ceased to operate. Derelict.
Shannon Airport - Built 1963. Sold to CG Hotels and now a Park Inn 
Sneem - Parknasilla Hotel, built 1895, still operating

Disposed prior to closure
Belfast - Russel Court Hotel, built 1972, closed 1976 after repeated bombings. Now apartments.
Bundoran - Built 1894. Sold 1976. Has reverted to its original name of the Great Northern Hotel after the Great Northern Railway who built it. Still trading.
Kenmare - Built 1897. Closed in the 1970s but has reopened as the Park Hotel
Killarney Torc Hotel - Built 1968, closed in 2002. Has been demolished for a cinema
Mulranny - sold in 1976. Now the Mulranny Park Hotel
Sligo - built 1927. Sold in the 1970s, reopened as the Sligo Southern Hotel in 1983 and still trading

Unbuilt Proposals
Donnybrook - 400 room hotel proposed on site of still operational Dublin Bus garage

References

Defunct companies of the Republic of Ireland
Defunct hotel chains